Zafer Algöz (born 30 August 1961) is a Turkish actor, best known for his films Salkım Hanımın Taneleri (1999), A.R.O.G (2008) and Yahşi Batı (2010).

Biography
He began acting classes in 1975, which were held by Bursa State Theatre.  In 1980, he attended Ankara State Conservatory Department of Theatre, graduating in 1985. In the same year, he began his acting career at Bursa State Theatre.

In 1989, Algöz was appointed to Istanbul State Theatre. He has played several roles. Also he has appeared in many films and television shows. Currently, he works at Istanbul State Theatre.

Awards 
 10th Lions Theatre Awards, 2010, Best Comedy Actor, God of Carnage

Theatre 

 Hamlet, William Shakespeare - Istanbul State Tiyatrosu
 Amadeus, Peter Shaffer - Istanbul State Theatre
 Macbeth, William Shakespeare - Istanbul State Theatre
 God of Carnage, Yasmina Reza - Istanbul State Theatre
 Long Live Comedy, Anton Chekhov - Istanbul State Theatre
 Black comedy, Peter Shaffer - Istanbul State Theatre
 The Resistible Rise of Arturo Ui, Bertolt Brecht - Istanbul
 Münasebetsiz, Francis Veber - Donkişot Tiyatro
 Ay Işığında Şamata, Haldun Taner - Istanbul State Theatre
 Yaşar Ne Yaşar Ne Yaşamaz, Aziz Nesin - Istanbul State Theatre
 Babaanem Yüz Yaşında (La nona), Roberto Cossa

Filmography 
Zafer Algöz starred in following films and television series:

Movie

Television series

References

External links 
 

1961 births
Turkish male stage actors
Living people
Ankara State Conservatory alumni
People from Kars
Turkish male film actors
Turkish male television actors